Jonathan Matías Blanco (born 29 April 1987, in José C. Paz, Buenos Aires) is an Argentine football player who plays as a defensive midfielder for Barracas Central.

He made his debut on June 22, 2008, for Tigre.

External links
Jonathan Blanco – Argentine Primera statistics at Fútbol XXI 
 

1987 births
Living people
Argentine footballers
Sportspeople from Buenos Aires Province
Aldosivi footballers
Club Atlético Tigre footballers
Olimpo footballers
Club Agropecuario Argentino players
All Boys footballers
Barracas Central players
Primera Nacional players
Association football midfielders